Ischnura is a genus of damselflies known as forktails (or sometimes bluetails) in the family Coenagrionidae.
Forktails are distributed worldwide, including various oceanic islands. The males have a forked projection at the tip of the abdomen which gives the group their common name.

Characteristics
Forktails are small or very small damselflies. The compound eyes of mature individuals have a dark upper region and contrasting lower part. The thorax is often green and may have lateral stripes and the abdomen in males is black with a blue tip. Females of some species are polymorphic, some being orangish and darkening with age, while others resemble the male.

Species
The genus Ischnura includes the following species:

References

 
Zygoptera genera
Odonata of Oceania
Odonata of Asia
Odonata of Africa
Odonata of Australia
Odonata of New Zealand
Odonata of North America
Odonata of South America
Odonata of Europe
Taxa named by Toussaint de Charpentier
Damselflies
Taxonomy articles created by Polbot